James E. Thorpe (October 28, 1927 – March 28, 2007) was a former member of the Ohio House of Representatives.

References

1927 births
Republican Party members of the Ohio House of Representatives
2007 deaths
20th-century American politicians